The  (Southern Superbypass of Guadalajara), designated and signed as Federal Highway GUA 10D, is a toll road in Mexico. It serves as a bypass around Greater Guadalajara and currently links the Guadalajara–Tepic toll road (Mexican Federal Highway 15D) on the west with the Guadalajara–Lagos de Moreno toll road (Mexican Federal Highway 80D) to the east.
The highway opened in its entirety in November 2017; it was formally inaugurated on January 8, 2018, by President Enrique Peña Nieto.
As of 2018, the toll for the  stretch of highway is 299 pesos.

Criticism
In 2018, upon the road's inauguration, the president of the National Confederation of Mexican Shippers, Manuel Sánchez Benavides, described the new bypass as expensive, lacking basic services, and unsafe, particularly between Tlajomulco and Zapotlanejo, where 17 attacks on vehicles had been recorded in just five days.

References

External links 
Proyecto Macrolibramento
Shield Reference
  Macrolibramiento Sur De Guadalajara website

Mexican Federal Highways